Darvino is a rural locality (a village) in Tyumenyakovsky Selsoviet, Tuymazinsky District, Bashkortostan, Russia. The population was 138 as of 2010. There is 1 street.

Geography 
Darvino is located 19 km north of Tuymazy (the district's administrative centre) by road. Pokrovka is the nearest rural locality.

References 

Rural localities in Tuymazinsky District